Solange Ayanone is a Rwandan journalist and trainer.

Ayanone was the programs director for Isango Star and trainer for Syfia International. Ayanone is the Vice President of the Rwanda Journalists Association and an MBA graduate at the University of Kigali.

References 

Living people
Rwandan journalists
Rwandan women journalists
Year of birth missing (living people)